The Sixteenth Texas Legislature met from January 14 to July 9, 1879 in its regular session and one called session. All members of the House of Representatives and about half of the members of the Senate were elected in 1878 General Election.

Sessions
16th Regular session: January 14–April 24, 1879
16th First called session: June 10–July 9, 1879

Party summary

Officers

Senate
 Lieutenant Governor
 Joseph Draper Sayers, Democrat
 President pro tempore
 Edwin Hobby, Democrat, Regular session, ad interim
 Leonidas Jefferson Storey, Democrat, First called session

House of Representatives
 Speaker of the House
 John Hughes Cochran, Democrat

Members
Members of the Sixteenth Texas Legislature as of the beginning of the Regular Session, January 14, 1879:

Senate

House of Representatives

Benjamin M. Baker
Thomas Beck
William Bell
Guy Morrison Bryan
William Clemens
John Hughes Cochran
James N. English
R. J. Evans
George Finlay
Jacob E. Freeman
Samuel Frost
Caleb Jackson Garrison
Charles Reese Gibson
Bedford G. Guy
William Kercheval Homan
Elias Mayes
George Pickett
Joseph Benjamin Polley
Alonzo Sledge
Ashbel Smith
Felix Ezell Smith
M. D. K. Taylor
Robert H. Taylor
Benjamin Franklin Williams
Charles Louis Wurzbach

Membership Changes

 District 16: Buchanan was elected in special election February 17, 1880
 District 20: Homan was reelected in special election February 17, 1880

External links

16 Texas Legislature
1879 in Texas
1879 U.S. legislative sessions